Callidula kobesi is a moth of the  family Callidulidae. It is endemic to Borneo.

Its wingspan is 15–16 mm.

References

Callidulidae
Moths described in 1998